Dr Savita Bhimrao Ambedkar ( Kabir; 27 January 1909 – 29 May 2003), was an Indian social activist, doctor and the second wife of Babasaheb Ambedkar. Ambedkarites and Buddhists refer to her as Mai or Maisaheb, which stands for 'Mother' in Marathi language.

In B. R. Ambedkar's various movements, during the writing of the books, Indian Constitution and Hindu code bills and Buddhist mass conversion, she helped him from time to time. Babasaheb Ambedkar credited her in preface of his book The Buddha and His Dhamma for extending his life for eight-ten years.

Early life and education
Savita Ambedkar as Sharada Kabir was born on 27 January 1909 in Bombay in a kabirpanthi Family.Her mother's name was Janaki and father's name was Krishnarao Vinayak Kabir. Her family hailed from Doors village, located in Rajapur tehsil of Ratnagiri district, Maharashtra. Later, her father migrated from Ratnagiri to Bombay. On the Sir Rao Bahadur C. K. Bole Road, near the "kabootarkhana" (pigeon house) in Dadar West, the Kabir family had rented a house in Sahru's house in Matruchaya.

Savita's early education was completed in Pune. In 1937 she completed her MBBS degree from Grant Medical College, Bombay. When her studies were completed, she was appointed as the first class medical officer in a major hospital in Gujarat. But after some months of illness, she left her job and returned home. Her six of eight siblings had inter-caste marriages. Those days it was an extraordinary thing for Indians. Savita said, "Our family did not oppose inter-caste marriages, because the whole family was educated and progressive."

Career and meeting with Ambedkar 

At Bombay's Vile Parle, lived a doctor named S.M. Rao who had close links with B. R. Ambedkar. When Ambedkar came from Delhi to Bombay, he often used to visit the doctor. Sharada Kabir also used to visit Dr. Rao's house as she had a family relation with him. One day Ambedkar had come from Delhi and Dr. Sharada Kabir was also present at that time. Dr. Rao formally introduced them. Dr. B.R. Ambedkar was then the Labor Minister in the Viceroy's Executive Council. Dr. Sharda did not know much about Dr. Ambedkar, except that he was a member of the Viceroy's Council. Dr. Sharada was impressed with Dr. Ambedkar's stunning personality. In their first meeting, she realised that Dr. Ambedkar was an extraordinary and great figure, In this first meeting, Ambedkar inquired about Kabir with interest. The reason for this was that they were working on the advancement of women. Ambedkar congratulated them. There was also discussion about Buddhism in this meeting.

His second meeting took place in the Advice Room of Dr. Mavalankar. Ambedkar had a blood pressure problem, blood sugar problem and joint pain at that time. In 1947, during the writing of the Indian Constitution, Dr. Ambedkar got health related problems due to diabetes and high blood pressure. He did not sleep well.  He went to Bombay for treatment. During the time of his treatment Dr. Sharada grew close to Ambedkar; Ambedkar's first wife, Ramabai Ambedkar, having died in 1935 after a long illness. Many rounds of meetings took place between Dr. Sharda and Ambedkar and later, they also corresponded. There was talk of literature, society, religion etc. Sometimes they also debated. Ambedkar used to listen to Sharda's arguments carefully and then respond. In 1947, Ambedkar started worrying about his health. He wanted someone to take care of his health. In a letter to Dadasaheb Gaikwad on 16 March 1948, Ambedkar wrote that keeping a woman nurse or caretaker might cause a scandal, hence marriage would be a better way to get someone to look after him. After the death of Yashwant's mother (Ramabai), he had decided not to marry, considering the situation, Ambedkar told Dadasaheb that he might have to reconsider his decision. Ambedkar already knew Dr. Sharda and took medical service from her so the two of them decided to get married.

Marriage

On 15 April 1948 Sharda Kabir married Bhimrao Ambedkar. She was 39 and he was 57. After their marriage, she was popularly called "Mai" (mother) by his followers. As registrar for marriage, Rameshwar Dayal, Deputy Commissioner, was called in Delhi. This marriage was completed as a Civil Marriage under the Civil Marriage Act. Among those who attended this occasion were Rai Sahab Puran Chand, Mr Macy (Private Secretary), Neelkanth, Ramkrishna Chandiwala, Estate Officer Meshram, nephew of Chitre, his wife, Sharda Kabir's brother. Also Home Secretary Banerjee On 28 November 1948, the newly married couple, the then governor-general of India, C. Rajagopalachari, invited them for the Sneh Bhoj and greeted them. After marriage Sharda adopted the name 'Savita'. But Ambedkar used to call her "Shārū" in old name, which was a word of "Shāradā".

After marriage, Savita started serving husband. Ambedkar's health was steadily getting worse. She continued her care with full devotion till the last of Ambedkar's service. Ambedkar mentioned the help he received from wife in a book written on 15 March 1956, in a book The Buddha and His Dhamma. In this preface, he mentioned that Savita Ambedkar increased his age by 8–10 years. After Ambedkar's death, his close friends and followers removed this role from this book. The Bengali Buddhist author Bhagwan Das published his preface as a "rare preface".

Conversion to Buddhism

On Ashok Vijaya Dashami (The Day on which Buddhism was accepted by Emperor Ashoka the Great) 14 October 1956, Savita Ambedkar accepted Buddhism along with her husband Bhimrao Ambedkar in Deekshabhoomi, Nagpur. She was given the initiation of Buddha's Dhamma by the Burmese Bhikkhu Mahastavir Chandramani giving Three Jewels and Five precepts. After this, B. R. Ambedkar himself initiated Buddhism by giving 500,000 followers of Three Jewels, Five precepts and twenty-two pledges. This oath took place at 9 a.m.. Savita Ambedkar became the first woman to accept Buddhism of this conversion movement.

Allegations and contradictions 
Many People from Delhi came to meet B. R. Ambedkar at 26, Alipur Road, where Ambedkar was in residence. It wasn't possible for everyone to get a glimpse of Dr. Ambedkar as he was sick. Savita Ambedkar had dual obligations while taking care of him, in addition to being a doctor. 

After the death of Babasaheb Ambedkar in December 1956, some Ambedkarites blamed Savita Ambedkar for killing him. They separated her from the Ambedkarite movement by describing her as a Brahmin. She took herself up to his farmhouse in Mehrauli in Delhi. Till 1972, she was living in Delhi. The then Prime Minister Jawaharlal Nehru formed a committee to investigate the matter, and that committee released her from the charges after the investigation.

After the demise of Babasaheb, PM Jawaharlal Nehru, PM Indira Gandhi and President Sarvepalli Radhakrishnan decided to take Maisaheb to Rajya Sabha. With the support of the Congress party, she was going to be a member of the Rajya Sabha, but she would have betrayed the husband's principle, so she humbly refused the proposals thrice.

Repatriation with the Dalit movement 

Republican Party of India leader Ramdas Athavale and Gangadhar Gade brought her back to the mainstream Ambedkarite movement. The young activists of Dalit Panthers movement treated Mai with respect. She played an important role in the movement about the book Riddles in Hinduism. Her role earned her respect and got rid of the misunderstanding of Dalits. Later on, she was separated from him as she grew older. Babasaheb Ambedkar was given the 'Bharat Ratna', the highest civilian award, it was accepted by Savita Ambedkar honoured by the then President Ramaswamy Venkataraman on 14 April 1990. It was his legendary birth anniversary. This award ceremony was held at the Darbar Hall / Ashok Hall of Rashtrapati Bhavan.

Death
Savita Ambedkar became lonely after her husband's death. Later, she rejoined the Dalit movement for some time. On 19 April 2003, she suffered difficulties in breathing, and was admitted to J.J. Hospital. She died on 29 May 2003 at the age of 94 at J.J. Hospital in Mumbai.

Writings 
She wrote a memorable and autobiographical Marathi book titled "Dr. Ambedkaranchya Sahwasat" (English: In companionship with Dr. Ambedkar). She also contributed to Dr. Babasaheb Ambedkar film. Mrinal Kulkarni played the role of her in this film.

Bibliography
 Babasahebanchi Sawali: Dr. Savita Ambedkar (Maisaheb) (Babasaheb's shadow: Dr. Savita Ambedkar (Maisaheb)) – Prof. Kirtilata Rambhau Petkar, 2016
 Dr. Babasaheb Ambedkaranchya Sawlicha Sangharsh (The struggle of the shadow of Dr. Babasaheb Ambedkar) — Vijay Sukhdeve
 Dr. Maisaheb Ambedkaranchya Sahwasat (In contact with Dr. Maisaheb Ambedkar) — Vaishali Bhalerao
 Dr. Maisaheb Ambedkar – Walmika Ahire
 Great Self-Sacrifice of Maisaheb Ambedkar – Prof. P. V. Sukhadeve
 Maisahebanche Agnidivya – Prof. P. V. Sukhadeve
 Maisaheb: Charitra ani Karya (Maisaheb: Biography and Work)
 Mahamanvachi Sanjivani (Sanjeevani of the Great Man)

See also 
 Ramabai Ambedkar
 Ambedkar family
 Yashwant Ambedkar

References

External links

 Vijay Surwade — living encyclopedia of Ambedkarism

1909 births
2003 deaths
20th-century Indian women
20th-century Indian people
21st-century Indian women
21st-century Indian people
Spouses of Indian politicians
Spouses of national leaders
Savita
Women from Maharashtra
People from Ratnagiri district
Marathi-language writers
Buddhist activists
20th-century Buddhists
21st-century Buddhists
Indian Buddhists
Converts to Buddhism from Hinduism
People from Mumbai